Antonio Zito (born 6 June 1986) is an Italian footballer who plays for Nola.

Biography

Sorrento
Zito started his career at Sorrento of Serie D. Which is within the province of Naples.

Taranto
He then signed by Taranto Sport of Serie C1.

Siena
In January 2008, he was signed by Siena of Serie A, along with Manuel Mancini, for €207,000 and €50,000 respectively, which they remained at Taranto until the end of season. Zito made his Serie A debut on 25 January 2009 against Atalanta, substituted Emanuele Calaiò in 84 minute. Zito played the hold second half on 24 May and played the first half at starter on 31 May, the last match of Serie A.

In July 2009, he was loaned to Crotone which newly promoted to Serie B, with option to purchase.

Juve Stabia
On 6 July 2011 he was released by Siena. Zito joined S.S. Juve Stabia in the same transfer windows.

Ternana
On 29 July 2013 he was signed by Ternana.

Avellino
On 11 July 2014 he was signed by Avellino in a 3-year contract.

Salernitana
On 8 January 2016 Zito was signed by Salernitana in a -year contract.

Picerno
On 30 September 2020 he moved to Serie D club Picerno.

Paganese
On 18 August 2021, he signed with Paganese.

References

External links
 
 
 

Italian footballers
Taranto F.C. 1927 players
A.C.N. Siena 1904 players
S.S. Juve Stabia players
Ternana Calcio players
U.S. Avellino 1912 players
U.S. Salernitana 1919 players
Casertana F.C. players
AZ Picerno players
Paganese Calcio 1926 players
Serie A players
Serie B players
Serie C players
Serie D players
Association football midfielders
Footballers from Naples
1986 births
Living people